Figures In Motion is an independent children's book publisher based in Bellingham, Washington.

Background

Founded in 2008, Figures In Motion publishes interactive educational books for elementary aged children. The books are printed on card stock with illustrations of historic leaders from varying time periods in history. Children color, cut, and assemble movable action figures of historic people.

Books published

Figures in Motion publishes non-fiction books for children ages 6 to 12. Famous Figures of Ancient Times, the first title published, has won multiple awards for design and educational merit. The book begins with the Pharaoh Narmer, an ancient Egyptian king who is credited with the unification of Egypt, and ends with Augustine, a Christian philosopher and theologian.

Other titles in the Famous Figures series include medieval times, the Renaissance, the American Revolution, and the Civil War.

References

Barnes, Jim. "2009 IPPY Awards National and Regional Results." Independentpublisher.com. Independent Publisher, April 2009. Retrieved March 2016
Diez-Luckie, Cathy. "What Would You Include in a Children's Book About the Ancient World?" historynewsnetwork.com. George Mason University's History News Network, Jan. 2010. Retrieved March 2016.

External links
 Figures In Motion website

Book publishing companies based in the San Francisco Bay Area
Book publishing companies based in California